Edsall is the surname of:

James K. Edsall (1831-1892), American politician
John Tileston Edsall (1902-2002), an early protein scientist
Joseph E. Edsall (1789-1865), American politician
Norman Edsall (1873-1899), US Navy sailor
Randy Edsall (born 1958), American college football head coach
Samuel Cook Edsall (1860-1917), American Episcopal bishop
Thomas B. Edsall (born 1941), American journalist and academic